The Tragedy of Donohoe (1835; retitled The Bushrangers, a Play in Five Acts in 1853, The Bush-Rangers in 1860 and Stalwart the Bushranger in 1867) is a play by Charles Harpur.

Origins and revisions 
Harpur wrote The Tragedy of Donhoe while living in Sydney in the early 1830s. It was originally based on the life of Jack Donahue, a prominent bushranger who had murdered William Clements in 1828. Harpur continually revised the play, however, and in later versions he renamed the protagonist "Stalwart" and his victim "Abel". By the time he died, Harpur had produced at least four distinct versions of the play. The play's complex textual history began in 1834, when Harpur presented a manuscript to Edward Smith Hall, the editor of The Sydney Monitor. Hall was impressed with the play, and published substantial extracts in the newspaper the following February. Harpur published the first complete version of the play in 1853, as part of his book The Bushrangers, a Play in Five Acts, and Other Poems. He produced two final versions of the play, The Bush-Rangers in 1860 and Stalwart the Bushranger 1867; these versions remained in manuscript at his death.

Literary and dramatic significance 
The Tragedy of Donohoe is considered an important example of Gothic literature, nineteenth-century melodrama and Romantic tragedy.

References

External Links 

 Original Newspaper Publication of The Tragedy of Donohoe (Trove)
Australian literature
Tragedies (dramas)
Romanticism
Australian plays
Melodramas
1835 plays
1853 plays
1860 plays
1867 plays